The Indian College was an institution established in the 1640s in order to educate Native American students at Harvard College in the town of Cambridge, in the Massachusetts Bay Colony.  The Indian College's building, located in Harvard Yard, was completed in 1656. It housed a printing press used to publish the first Bible translated into a Native American language, the Eliot Indian Bible of 1663, which was also the first Bible in any language printed in British North America. 

The Indian College was supported financially by the Society for the Propagation of the Gospel in New England, a Christian missionary charity based in London.  It attracted only a handful of students and was closed in 1693, after which the building was demolished and its bricks used for another construction in Harvard Yard.  Some Native American students, however, attended Harvard afterwards.  In 1997, the authorities of Harvard University installed a plaque commemorating the Indian College. In 2009, remnants of the original Indian College were discovered during an archaeological dig in Harvard Yard and parts of the original printing press were recovered.

History

Origins
In the 1640s, in the midst of a crisis connected to the English Civil War, the leaders of Harvard College began seeking financial support to educate and convert the local Native Americans.  The new Harvard charter of 1650 declared its mission to be "the Education of the English and Indian Youth of the Country". Harvard obtained funds from the Society for the Propagation of the Gospel in New England (SPGNE), which agreed to pay for a new two-story brick building, the first of its kind erected on Harvard Yard. This building, the Indian College, was completed in 1656.  The building was large enough to accommodate about twenty students. However, at the time of completion no Native American students attended the college, and the building was used to accommodate colonial English students instead.

Printing press

The Indian College building housed the first printing press in the English colonies.  Under missionary John Eliot's direction, that press was used to print a translation of the Bible into the Massachusett language.  This Mamusse Wunneetupantamwe Um Biblum God, also known as the "Eliot Indian Bible", was the first Bible in any language printed in British North America, as well as the first full translation of the Christian Bible into a Native American language. James Printer, an Algonquian-speaking Nipmuc who converted to Christianity, did much of the translation and typesetting, and other Native Americans, such as Cockenoe, Job Nesuton, and John Sassamon (who studied at Harvard in 1653 prior to the creation of the Indian College), contributed to various parts of the translation.

The press issued 15 books in the Algonquian language and 85 in English.  By 1680, that printing press was no longer in use.  Harvard officially decommissioned it in 1692, after the death of the press's steward, Samuel Green.

Native American students
The Indian College building housed a total of four to five Native American students, but only one student, Caleb Cheeshahteaumuck, graduated from Harvard. At least four Native American students attended the college:

 Caleb Cheeshahteaumuck and Joel Hiacoomes were classmates.  Members of the Wampanoag tribe from Martha's Vineyard, they attended a preparatory school in Roxbury and were admitted to Harvard for a scheduled graduation of 1665.  A few months prior to graduation, Hiacoomes returned to Martha's Vineyard to visit relatives.  On the return trip, he was shipwrecked on Nantucket and not seen again. Caleb Cheeshahteaumuck successfully graduated, but died a few months later in Watertown, probably from tuberculosis.  His Latin address to the Society, beginning "Honoratissimi benefactores", has been preserved.

 John Wompas entered in 1666, but left the next year to become a mariner.

 A student named Eleazar entered in 1675, but contracted and died of smallpox shortly after.
Besides Sassamon (1653), "[t]here may have been another Indian who attended Harvard prior to the establishment of the Indian College, as records mention a Harvard-educated "Privy Councellor" with King Philip, who was supposedly killed during a skirmish with the colonists in July 1675." 
Also, some have speculated that Daniel Takawambait, one of the first ordained Indian ministers, and others attended the Indian College.

Closure
Because of the diseases that many Native Americans contracted upon coming into close contact with the English community, the building was little used for its intended purpose.  When Harvard Hall was completed in 1677, the English colonial students moved out of the Indian College and the building fell into disuse.  In 1693 the Harvard authorities, intending to reuse the bricks to construct a new building, asked the Society for the Propagation of the Gospel in New England for permission to tear down the Indian College building.  The Society's condition for approval was that Native American students "should enjoy their Studies rent free in said [new] building."  By 1698 the old building was torn down, but the bricks were re-used in constructing the original Stoughton Hall which existed until 1781, when Stoughton Hall was also torn down due to masonry issues, but half of its bricks were again retained for reuse by the College.

Legacy
Another member of the Nipmuc tribe, Benjamin Larnell, attended Harvard in the early 1700s, when the Indian College building no longer existed.  John Leverett, president of Harvard between 1708 and 1724, described Larnell in his personal diary as "an Acute Grammarian, an Extraordinary Latin Poet, and a good Greek one".  Judge Samuel Sewall wrote to a correspondent in London enclosing copies of Larnell's poems in Latin, Greek, and Hebrew as evidence of the progress made in educating the Native Americans, but those poems have not survived. Larnell died of a fever in 1714, aged about 20.  Larnell's Latin versification of Aesop's fable of the fox and the weasel, probably written when Larnell was a student at Boston Latin School, was re-discovered in 2012.

In 1997, in a ceremony attended by 300 people, a historic plaque was placed in Harvard Yard to commemorate the Indian College.

References

External links
 Harvard Archaeologists Find Traces of 17th-Century Indian College in the Yard

Harvard University
History of the Thirteen Colonies
Native American boarding schools
Native American history of Massachusetts
Tribal colleges and universities
Educational institutions established in the 1640s
1693 disestablishments
1640s establishments in Massachusetts
History of New England
Native American history
Wampanoag